Bacci is an Italian surname. Notable people with the surname include:

 Alessandro Bacci (born 1995), Italian football player
 Andrea Bacci (born 1972), Italian race car driver
 Antonio Bacci (1885–1971), Italian Cardinal of the Roman Catholic Church
 Antonio Bacci (painter) (17th century), Italian painter of the Baroque period
 Baccio Maria Bacci (1888-1974), Italian painter
 Cristiano Bacci (born 1975), Italian retired footballer 
 Edmondo Bacci (1913-1978), Italian painter
 Giancarlo Bacci (1931–2014), Italian footballer
 Giovanni Bacci (1857–1928), Italian journalist and politician
 Guglielmo Bacci (born 1955), Italian football coach
 Massimo Livi Bacci (1936), Italian professor of Demography
 Michele Bacci (1970), Professor of Medieval art at the University of Fribourg
 Orazio Bacci (1864–1917), Italian Liberal Party politician

Italian-language surnames